Vergel is both a surname and a given name. Notable people with the name include:

Surname
Ace Vergel (1953–2007), Filipino actor
Alfredo Petit-Vergel (1936–2021), Cuban Roman Catholic religious leader
Alicia Vergel (1927–1993), Filipino actress
Beverly Vergel, Filipino actress

Given name
Vergel Meneses (born 1969), Filipino basketball player
Vergel L. Lattimore, United States Air Force general and military chaplain